Emily Scott (born 30 June 1992) is an English rugby union player. She was selected as a member of the Great Britain women's national rugby sevens team to the 2016 Summer Olympics.

She went to Gable Hall School in Corringham, Essex and attended Brunel University. In 2014 Scott was among several female English rugby players to receive professional contracts.

Scott currently plays Fly Half for Harlequins Women, and won the Allianz Premier 15’s in 2020-21 season.

Scott was selected for the 2017 Women's Rugby World Cup squad.

References

External links 
 
 
 
 
 

1992 births
Living people
England women's international rugby union players
Female rugby union players
English female rugby union players
Female rugby sevens players
Rugby sevens players at the 2016 Summer Olympics
English rugby sevens players
Olympic rugby sevens players of Great Britain
Great Britain national rugby sevens team players
Commonwealth Games medallists in rugby sevens
Commonwealth Games bronze medallists for England
Rugby sevens players at the 2018 Commonwealth Games
England international women's rugby sevens players
Alumni of Brunel University London
Medallists at the 2018 Commonwealth Games